George Cullen Thomas (August 21, 1890 – January 11, 1973) was an American football, basketball, and baseball player and coach. He served as the head baseball coach at Butler University in Indianapolis, Indiana from 1910 to 1919. He also served as Butler's head football coach from 1912 to 1918 and as men's basketball coach during the 1912–13 season. Thomas was a charter member of Butler's Athletics Hall of Fame.

Thomas died on January 11, 1973, at Eitel Hospital in Minneapolis, Minnesota.

Head coaching record

Football

References

External links
 Butler Hall of Fame profile
 

1890 births
1973 deaths
Basketball coaches from Indiana
Butler Bulldogs athletic directors
Butler Bulldogs baseball coaches
Butler Bulldogs football coaches
Butler Bulldogs football players
Butler Bulldogs men's basketball coaches
College men's tennis players in the United States
College men's track and field athletes in the United States
People from Parke County, Indiana
Players of American football from Indiana